Tibbi Qaisrani is a town and union council of Taunsa District in the Punjab province of Pakistan. The town is part of Taunsa Tehsil. It is located at 31° 0'18.52"N  70°40'27.51"E and has an altitude of 137 metres (452 feet).

References

Populated places in Taunsa District
Taunsa District